List of Derry City Football Club seasons.

Seasons 

As a result of the Troubles in the 1970s Derry City were banned from playing home games at The Brandywell. Forced to play in front of dwindelling crowds and unable to continue financially Derry withdrew from the Irish League in 1972. Continuing as a Sunday league team the period was known as the Wilderness Years before they joined the League of Ireland in 1985.

Notes

References 

 
Derry City F.C.